Front of Transformationalist Principlists is an Iranian principlist political group, consisting of Society of Devotees of the Islamic Revolution and Society of Pathseekers of the Islamic Revolution.

The Transformationalists are part of United Front of Conservatives, and the closest group inside the United Front of Conservatives to the Front of Islamic Revolution Stability.

The group represents a new generation of younger and more updated  principlists who were previously commanders of Basij and Islamic Revolutionary Guard Corps.

Presidential candidates 
In the 2005 and 2013 elections, they supported Mohammad Bagher Ghalibaf. The Transformationalists endorsed Mahmoud Ahmadinejad in 2009.

References 

Political party alliances in Iran
Principlist political groups in Iran
Iranian Parliament fractions